Marechal Rondon International Airport  is the airport serving Cuiabá, Brazil, located in the adjoining municipality of Várzea Grande. It is named after Marshall Cândido Mariano da Silva Rondon (1865–1958), a Brazilian explorer.

It is operated by Aeroeste.

History

Marechal Rondon International Airport was inaugurated in 1956 but operated precariously until the first passenger terminal building was completed in 1964.

Infraero became the operator of the airport in 1975 and in 1996 it was upgraded to international status.

The first phase of the construction of the new passenger terminal was completed on 30 June 2006. The second phase would involve the demolition of the old terminal building and the construction of the enlargement of the new passenger terminal on its place.

On 31 August 2009, Infraero unveiled a BRL30.9 million (US$16.3 million; EUR11.4 million) investment plan to up-grade Marechal Rondon International Airport focusing on the preparations for the 2014 FIFA World Cup which was held in Brazil, Cuiabá being one of the venue cities. The investment was distributed in the renovation of passenger the terminal, parking and access to the airport.

On March 15, 2019 Aeroeste won a 30-year concession to operate the airport.

Airlines and destinations

Accidents and incidents
30 March 1980: a VOTEC Britten Norman BN-2A-9 Islander registration PT-JSC stalled and crashed upon take-off of Cuiabá. All 9 occupants died.
23 June 1985: a TABA Embraer EMB 110 Bandeirante registration PT-GJN flying from Juara to Cuiabá, while on approach to land at Cuiabá, had technical problems on engine number 1. An emergency landing was attempted but the aircraft stalled and crashed 1 km short of the runway. All 17 occupants died.

Access

See also

List of airports in Brazil

References

External links

Airports in Mato Grosso
Airports established in 1956
Várzea Grande, Mato Grosso